Adriano Bizerra Melo, better known as Adriano Magrão (born March 7, 1981), is a Brazilian footballer who plays as a striker.

He signed a one-and-a-half year contract with Fluminense in June 2006. He then played for Atlético Goianiense before signed a three-year contract with Sociedade Esportiva do Gama in May 2008. But in June 2008 he signed a 2-year deal for Bursaspor. However, he was released in January 2009. After he signed a 1-year deal for Náutico in Brazilian Série A. In January 2010, he completed the transfer to América de Natal from Gama.

Honours

Club

Sport

Campeonato Brasileiro Série B: 2006 (runner-up)

Fluminense

Copa do Brasil: 2007

References

External links
 

 
globoesporte 

1981 births
Living people
Brazilian footballers
Association football forwards
Brazilian expatriate footballers
Brazilian expatriate sportspeople in Turkey
Expatriate footballers in Turkey
Süper Lig players
Campeonato Brasileiro Série A players
Campeonato Brasileiro Série B players
Vila Nova Futebol Clube players
Iraty Sport Club players
Busan IPark players
K League 1 players
Sociedade Esportiva do Gama players
Associação Atlética Anapolina players
Fluminense FC players
Atlético Clube Goianiense players
Sport Club do Recife players
Expatriate footballers in South Korea
Bursaspor footballers
Clube Náutico Capibaribe players
Madureira Esporte Clube players
América Futebol Clube (RN) players
Paysandu Sport Club players
Sportspeople from Goiânia
Brazilian expatriate sportspeople in South Korea